Yngvar Bryn (17 December 1881 – 30 April 1947) was a Norwegian track and field athlete and pairs figure skater who competed in the 1900 Summer Olympics in Paris, France, and in the 1920 Summer Olympics held in Antwerp, Belgium.

At just aged 18 years old, Bryn won to silver medals at the 1899 Norwegian Athletic Championships in the 100 metres and 500 metre races, in 1901 and 1902 he became the Norwegian Champion in the 500 metres, he also became the 100 metres Norwegian record holder in 1902 when he recorded at time of 11.1 seconds.

In 1900 he participated in the 200 metres competition and in the 400 metres competition. In both events he was eliminated in the first round. As a track and field athlete Bryn was representing IK Tjalve. Bryn was elected president of the Norwegian Athletics Association in 1908 when aged just 26 years old, a position he held for the next three years.

As a pair skater, he competed with Alexia Bryn. They won silver medals at the 1920 Summer Olympics and at the 1923 World Figure Skating Championships, as well as the bronze at the 1912 Worlds. He is one of the oldest figure skating Olympic medalists.

In 1932 Bryn took part in his third Olympics, this time as a judge in both figure skating and speed skating during the Olympic Winter Games in Lake Placid. He chaired the Norwegian Skating Association from 1926 to 1927.

Bryn also studied philology at University of Oslo, and as well as all his sporting activities he was also a high school teacher up to his death in 1947 when aged 65 years old.

Results
Pairs with (Alexia Bryn)

References

 Database Olympics profile
 Pairs on Ice profile

External links

1881 births
1947 deaths
Norwegian male sprinters
Athletes (track and field) at the 1900 Summer Olympics
Olympic athletes of Norway
Norwegian male pair skaters
Figure skaters at the 1920 Summer Olympics
Olympic figure skaters of Norway
Olympic silver medalists for Norway
Norwegian sports executives and administrators
Olympic medalists in figure skating
World Figure Skating Championships medalists
Medalists at the 1920 Summer Olympics
Sportspeople from Kristiansand